The cuisine of the Mariana Islands is largely made up of meat dishes including pork, poultry, and meat from other land mammals. Some popular land animals consumed include Mariana fruit bat.

Like in many others archipelagos, the islands' surrounding waters make seafood another popular option. Some seafoods include sea cucumbers, and various fish. It is said that the Mariana Island's cuisine is heavily influenced by its neighbors Papuan, Hawaiian, and American cuisines. The Mariana's cuisine is very international, with many dishes, such as Korean kimchi, Filipino pancit and Spanish empanadas being enjoyed on the islands.

Some of the most well known local specialties are kelaguen, a Chamorro dish consisting of chicken, shrimp, fish or beef marinated in a mix of lemon juice and fresh coconut, red rice made with annatto and kå'du fanihi, a soup made of fruit bat or flying fox and Guyuria cookies.

Guam is also the highest per capita consumer of Tabasco sauce in the world.

References

See also
 List of Oceanian cuisines

 
Mariana Islands